Potlogeni may refer to several places in Romania:

Potlogeni, a village in Tia Mare Commune, Olt County
Potlogeni-Deal, a village in Petreşti Commune, Dâmboviţa County
Potlogeni-Vale, a village in Crângurile Commune, Dâmboviţa County